Prunum labiatum is a species of sea snail, a marine gastropod mollusk in the family Marginellidae, the margin snails.

Description

Distribution
P. labiatum can be found in Caribbean waters, ranging from Campeche to Quintana Roo.

References

Marginellidae
Gastropods described in 1841